Hankha is a district (amphoe) in the southwestern part of Chai Nat province, central Thailand.

History
Originally the district was named Doem Bang Kao (เดิมบางเก่า). It was renamed in 1911 to Ban Chian after the central tambon, as the tambon Doem Bang was at the same time reassigned to the newly created Doem Bang District. In 1927 the district office was moved to Hankha market, and in 1939 the district name was changed accordingly to Hankha.

Geography
Neighboring districts are (from the north clockwise) Nong Mamong, Wat Sing, Mueang Chai Nat, and Sankhaburi of Chai Nat Province; Doem Bang Nang Buat of Suphan Buri province; Noen Kham of Chai Nat Province; and Ban Rai of Uthai Thani province.

The important water resource is the Tha Chin River.

Administration
The district is divided into eight sub-districts (tambons), which are further subdivided into 99 villages (mubans). There are two sub-district municipalities (thesaban tambon): Hankha and Sam Ngam Tha Bot each cover parts of tambons of the same name. There are a further eight tambon administrative organizations (TAO).

Missing numbers are tambon which now form Noen Kham District.

References

External links
amphoe.com
	

Hankha